Simon Mopinot (1685–1724) was a French Maurist scholar.

Mopinot was born at Reims, was educated at the Abbey of Saint-Faron in Meaux, and took Benedictine vows there in 1703. He worked with Marie Didier on an edition of Tertullian, then with Pierre Coustant on papal decretals.

Notes

External links
Old encyclopedia article
New General Biographical Dictionary
 BBKL page

1685 births
1724 deaths
Benedictines
Clergy from Reims
Writers from Reims